Kchouk is an Arabic surname. Notable people with the surname include:

 Bechir Kchouk (1924–1983), Tunisian chess master
 Sliman Kchouk (born 1994), Tunisian footballer

Arabic-language surnames